The 2016 South Asian Games, officially the XII South Asian Games, is a major multi-sport event which took place from 5 February to 16 February 2016 in Guwahati and Shillong, India. A total of 2,672 athletes competed in 226 events over 22 sports. Indian Prime Minister Narendra Modi inaugurated the 2016 South Asian Games in Guwahati on 5 February 2016. India continued its dominance in the game's medal tally with a staggering 308 medals including 188 gold medals.

Host selection
The games were originally scheduled to be held in 2012 in Kathmandu, but were postponed to Delhi for 2013 but again, were postponed to late 2015 because of the suspension of the Indian Olympic Association. In 2015 it was decided to further postpone the competition to early 2016, because participating countries felt the December dates did not present enough time for preparation.

Logo, Mascot and Anthem

The Mascot

On 19 December 2015, Tikhor the baby Indian Rhino was unveiled to the public as the official mascot for the 2016 South Asian Games. According to the organising committee, Tikhor carries the message of Peace, Progress, and Prosperity in the South Asian region. This is in line with the official motto, "Play for Peace, Progress and Prosperity".

The Anthem 
The anthem of the games was chosen to be a famous Assamese song, "Ei Prithibi Ek Krirangan" (The world is a playground) by Bhupen Hazarika, an Indian lyricist, musician, singer, poet and film-maker from Assam.

The Games

Sports
There are 228 events in 23 sports scheduled to be held. A total of 764 medals (228 gold, 228 silver and 308 bronze medals) are on offer in 2016 South Asian Games.

Participating nations
8 countries competed in 2016 South Asian Games.

Medal tally

After Doping Test Result.

Calendar
Competition scheduled accurate as of 5 February 2016.

Controversy

IOA ban and delay
Initially, the Games were expected to be held in October, 2012. However, during the General Body meeting of the Indian Olympic Association (IOA) on 16 December 2011, it was decided to postpone the Games to February, 2013. The primary concern highlighted was that the original plan meant that the Games would be held only two months after the 2012 Summer Olympics, a fact which made athletes uncomfortable. In addition, the Delhi Government had stated that "accommodation would be a problem during October–November". In April 2012, the IOA sent letters to all the National Olympic Committees (NOCs) of South Asia, announcing that the Games will be held for eight days beginning from 13 February 2013; further discussions would take place at an all-NOC meeting in Moscow. President of the Nepal Olympic Committee Dhruba Bahadur Pradhan also reported about the proposed additions of fencing, equestrian, gymnastics and the triathlon to the Games schedule. As of January 2013, host city and dates of the games were not yet confirmed.

The International Olympic Committee banned the Indian Committee in March for political interference (the national government played a role in Olympic officials' selection). This delayed the event further as the ban was only lifted in May and the possibility of a low-cost edition of the games was raised among ongoing hosting discussions and poor relations with neighboring Pakistan due to the 2013 India–Pakistan border incidents.

2 years later, on 11 February 2014, the International Olympic Committee decided to lift the ban. Up until now, the Indian side competed in Olympic events such as the Winter Olympic Games as independent participants.

A year later, on 5 June 2015, the uncertainty over the venue to host the 12th South Asian Games ended with the Sports Ministry and Indian Olympic Association deciding to hold the regional multi-sporting event in Guwahati and Shillong in November–December 2015. However, this was postponed even further to a tentative date of February 2016.

ULFA anti-talks faction also pledged support to South Asian Games, which is opposite to its stand on 2007 National Games of India held in Guwahati.

On 3 February 2016, International Basketball Federation (FIBA) stated that it will not recognise the competition because of "unacceptable interference by Indian Olympic Association in affairs of the Basketball Federation of India".

Pakistani women's volleyball team is  returning to South Asian Games after two decades - for the first time after their participation in 1995 South Asian Games, Madras where they had finished with a bronze medal. Afghanistan and Pakistan basketball teams will not participate. Union Home ministry had sanctioned  to the police authorities to upgrade their security apparatus for the South Asian Games.

India granted special concession to Pakistani athletes taking part in the 12th South Asian Games by declaring Guwahati and Kolkata as designated entry points for them.

Further political interference
Initially, the Basketball event was scheduled to take place in 11 February, however FIBA, Basketball's world governing body, decided to de-recognise the tournament on the grounds of political interference from the Indian Government and the Indian Olympic Association. This resulted in the entire event being cancelled, so rather having 228 events in 23 sports, the competition change to 226 events in 22 sports causing further scrutiny over the organization of the games.

Doping at the 2016 South Asian Games 
On february 7, 2016 after completion of squash event, Nasir Iqbal was asked to give his sample by World Anti Doping Agency (WADA). First Sample was tested positive and later after 3 days another test got the result as negative. Although he challenged, after significant evaluation WADA decided to dismiss his appeal and banned him for 4 years, from February 19, 2016 to February 19, 2020.

Nasir Iqbal was also stripped off from the Squash Men's Singles Gold-medalist Title.

See also
2010 South Asian Games

References

External links
Official website
Video catchup on all events
Final Results

 
South Asian Games
South Asian Games
South Asian Games
South Asian Games
South Asian Games, 2016
Multi-sport events in India
February 2016 sports events in India